Roisin may refer to:

 Róisín, Roisin or Rosheen, an Irish female given name (including a list of persons with the name)
 "Róisín Dubh" (song), an Irish political song
 "Róisín Dubh", a track from the Thin Lizzy album Black Rose: A Rock Legend
 LÉ Róisín (P51), a ship in the Irish Naval Service
 Roisin (Honnelles), a village in the Belgian municipality of Honnelles